Bassam Beidas (born 26 December 1988) is a British-born Lebanese former professional tennis player.

Biography
Beidas, who was born in London, is the son of Lebanese parents who left the country during the civil war and his father is originally from Palestine. In junior tennis he was ranked in the world's top-20 and was a boys' doubles semi-finalist at the Australian Open, as well as a doubles winner of the Eddie Herr International Championships. After growing up in Egypt, where he was educated at the Manor House School, Beidas came to the United States and played collegiate tennis for Pepperdine University, earning All-American honors three times.

Graduating from Pepperdine in 2011, Beidas reached a best singles ranking of 499 on the professional tour. He won one singles and five doubles titles at ITF Futures level. Between 2011 and 2014 he was a member of the Lebanon Davis Cup team, having previously played a solitary year in 2007. During his Davis Cup career he won 16 of his 17 singles rubbers, with a further five wins in doubles. He retired from professional tennis at the age of 26.

ITF Futures titles

Singles: (1)

Doubles: (5)

References

External links
 
 
 

1988 births
Living people
Lebanese male tennis players
Pepperdine Waves men's tennis players
Lebanese people of Palestinian descent
Tennis people from Greater London
Sportspeople from Cairo
Lebanese emigrants to Egypt